PT Media Nusantara Citra Tbk (commonly known as MNC Media or MNC) is an Indonesian media company founded on 17 June 1997 as PT Panca Andika Mandiri, it was renamed to the present name on 12 September 2002. It is owned by PT Global Mediacom Tbk (formerly PT Bimantara Citra Tbk), which in turn is owned by MNC Asia Holding. On 17 October 2011, Los Angeles-based investment company Saban Capital Group acquired a 7.5% stake.

MNC has core businesses in content. The group owns and operates four free-to-air television networks – RCTI, MNCTV, GTV, and iNews – as well as 19 channels broadcast on pay television under MNC Channels division. MNC also has other media based businesses that support its core businesses. Those businesses consist of radio, print media, talent management, and a production house.

Overview
MNC was established on 17 June 1997 and has been listed on the Indonesia Stock Exchange (IDX) since 22 June 2007 under the ticker symbol MNCN.

MNC has biggest share of the free-to-air market. The group also has three pay television networks, Indovision, Okevision and Top TV. Company also expanding the Sindo Media which include Koran Sindo newspaper, portal sindonews.com and Sindo Weekly magazine. There is also has another portal, such as Okezone, Celebrities.id and Sportstars.id.

In June 2016, PT Media Nusantara Citra Tbk (MNCN) has been funded by Creador, a private equity firm in Southeast and South Asia. The investment was sourced from Creador Fund I to expand production facilities and enhance their free-to-air services across an underpenetrated Indonesian market.

The company operates as an integrated media company in Indonesia.

Gallery

See also
List of programmes broadcast by Media Nusantara Citra

References

External links

 MNC Media Website

 
Indonesian companies established in 1997
Mass media companies established in 1997
Mass media companies of Indonesia
Companies based in Jakarta
Companies listed on the Indonesia Stock Exchange
2007 initial public offerings
MNC Corporation